This is a list of Vegas Golden Knights broadcasters from the National Hockey League.

Television
AT&T SportsNet Rocky Mountain is the regional television rightsholder for all Golden Knights games not broadcast nationally by NBCSN or NBC. The team's designated market includes Nevada, Idaho, Montana, Utah, Wyoming, and parts of Arizona and California. Golden Knights games on AT&T SportsNet are called by former Boston Bruins radio announcer Dave Goucher on play-by-play, and Shane Hnidy, who previously worked color for the Winnipeg Jets on TSN.

KTNV-TV broadcasts games only during the preseason.

Current on-air staff

 Daren Millard – Golden Knights studio host
 Dave Goucher – Golden Knights play-by-play
 Shane Hnidy – Golden Knights color commentator
 Darren Eliot – Golden Knights studio analyst
 Ashali Vise – Golden Knights rinkside reporter
 Gary Lawless – Golden Knights reporter/radio color commentator
 Dan D'Uva - Golden Knights radio play-by-play
 Mark Shunock- In-Arena Host 
 Katie Marie Jones- In-Arena Host

Radio

The team has a three-year radio deal with Lotus Broadcasting. Lotus airs the team's games on its Fox Sports Radio affiliate, KKGK 1340/98.9. KKGK fronts a network of nine stations across Nevada, California, Arizona, and Utah. Dan D'Uva and Gary Lawless were announced as the Golden Knights' first radio play-by-play announcer and color commentator respectively. 

It was also announced that KLAV's FM translator K255CT would switch to a simulcast of KKGK (then KRLV) on 98.9 FM.

One game a week is also aired on the company's ESPN Deportes Radio affiliate, KENO 1460, making the team one of only three in the NHL to offer Spanish-language broadcasts. And Jesus Lopez and Herbert Castro provide play-by-play and color commentary respectively on KENO.

References

External links
Vegas Golden Knights Announce New Additions To Broadcast Lineup
Golden Knights Announce First-Ever Television And Radio Broadcasters
Golden Knights making changes to TV broadcast team
Golden Knights announce changes to broadcast team
Golden Knights Hire TV Studio, Rinkside Broadcasters To Replace Gismondi, May, Lazoff (Who Now Works For Anaheim Ducks)
Veteran Bruins Radio Voice Joins Vegas Golden Knights TV Booth.
Golden Knights Announce Announcers For TV And Radio Broadcasts
Golden Knights release national TV schedule for 2019-2020 season
Fox Sports Radio Listen Live - KRLV, 1340 kHz AM

Vegas Golden Knights announcers
broadcasters
Lists of National Hockey League broadcasters
AT&T SportsNet